Complete results for Women's Giant Slalom competition at the 2011 World Championships, run on Thursday, February 17. The eighth race of the championships, its first run was scheduled to start at 10:00 local time (UTC+1), but was delayed two hours due to fog.  The second run start time was delayed 90 minutes to 15:00.

A total of 116 athletes from 48 countries competed.

Results

References

Giant slalom, women's
2011 in German women's sport
FIS